Ecoheatcool project was launched at the beginning of 2005 with support from the Intelligent Energy Europe programme. The project carried out by Euroheat & Power, in cooperation with 13 partners across Europe was concluded at the end of December 2006. 

The project assessed the heating and cooling markets, looked for possibilities for more district heating and district cooling in Europe, provided recommendations for policy makers and developed a tool for assessing the efficiency of district heating and cooling systems.  The project showed that district heating and cooling grids make it possible to optimally use and combine a large spectrum of "free" energy inputs: surplus heat from electricity production based on conventional or renewable fuels, from waste incineration and/or from industrial processes as well as different forms of renewable heat (i.e. geothermal, heat/cold from deep-sea or lake water).

The Ecoheatcool project became a reference for district heating and cooling sector, its findings being used in the arguments provided to European Union and national policy makers. It enabled the development of a vision, quantification of the benefits which the district heating and cooling sector can bring to achieving the EU policy objectives: energy efficiency, environmental protection, security of supply, use of renewable energy sources, avoided investments in peak electricity capacities, and evaluation of the costs.

External links
Ecoheatcool website

References 

Energy conservation